is a Japanese international rugby union player who plays as a lock or loose forward.

Club career

Yatabe has played all of his senior club rugby in Japan with the Panasonic Wild Knights who he joined in 2014.   He won the Top League in both 2015 and 2016.

International

Yatabe made his senior international debut in a match against South Korea on April 30, 2016 and featured in 3 more tests against Asian opposition in the spring of 2016 before making substitute appearances against  and  during the 2016 mid-year rugby union internationals series.

References

1986 births
Living people
Japanese rugby union players
Japan international rugby union players
Rugby union flankers
Rugby union locks
Saitama Wild Knights players
People from Gunma Prefecture
Sunwolves players